Protactinium (91Pa) has no stable isotopes. The four naturally occurring isotopes allow a standard atomic weight to be given.

Twenty-nine radioisotopes of protactinium have been characterized, ranging from 211Pa to 239Pa. The most stable isotope is 231Pa with a half-life of 32,760 years, 233Pa with a half-life of 26.967 days, and 230Pa with a half-life of 17.4 days. All of the remaining radioactive isotopes have half-lives less than 1.6 days, and the majority of these have half-lives less than 1.8 seconds. This element also has five meta states, 217mPa (t1/2 1.15 milliseconds), 220m1Pa (t1/2 = 308 nanoseconds), 220m2Pa (t1/2 = 69 nanoseconds), 229mPa (t1/2 = 420 nanoseconds), and 234mPa (t1/2 = 1.17 minutes).

The only naturally occurring isotopes are 231Pa, which occurs as an intermediate decay product of 235U, 234Pa and 234mPa, both of which occur as intermediate decay products of 238U. 231Pa makes up nearly all natural protactinium.

The primary decay mode for isotopes of Pa lighter than (and including) the most stable isotope 231Pa is alpha decay, except for 228Pa to 230Pa, which primarily decay by electron capture to isotopes of thorium. The primary mode for the heavier isotopes is beta minus (β−) decay. The primary decay products of 231Pa and isotopes of protactinium lighter than and including 227Pa are isotopes of actinium and the primary decay products for the heavier isotopes of protactinium are isotopes of uranium.

List of isotopes 

|-
| 211Pa
|
| style="text-align:right" | 91
| style="text-align:right" | 120
| 
| 3.8(+4.6−1.4) ms
| α
| 207Ac
| 9/2−#
|
|
|-
| 212Pa
|
| style="text-align:right" | 91
| style="text-align:right" | 121
| 212.02320(8)
| 8(5) ms[5.1(+61−19) ms]
| α
| 208Ac
| 7+#
|
|
|-
| 213Pa
|
| style="text-align:right" | 91
| style="text-align:right" | 122
| 213.02111(8)
| 7(3) ms[5.3(+40−16) ms]
| α
| 209Ac
| 9/2−#
|
|
|-
| 214Pa
|
| style="text-align:right" | 91
| style="text-align:right" | 123
| 214.02092(8)
| 17(3) ms
| α
| 210Ac
|
|
|
|-
| 215Pa
|
| style="text-align:right" | 91
| style="text-align:right" | 124
| 215.01919(9)
| 14(2) ms
| α
| 211Ac
| 9/2−#
|
|
|-
| rowspan=2|216Pa
| rowspan=2|
| rowspan=2 style="text-align:right" | 91
| rowspan=2 style="text-align:right" | 125
| rowspan=2|216.01911(8)
| rowspan=2|105(12) ms
| α (80%)
| 212Ac
| rowspan=2|
| rowspan=2|
| rowspan=2|
|-
| β+ (20%)
| 216Th
|-
| 217Pa
|
| style="text-align:right" | 91
| style="text-align:right" | 126
| 217.01832(6)
| 3.48(9) ms
| α
| 213Ac
| 9/2−#
|
|
|-
| rowspan=2 style="text-indent:1em" | 217mPa
| rowspan=2|
| rowspan=2 colspan="3" style="text-indent:2em" | 1860(7) keV
| rowspan=2|1.08(3) ms
| α
| 213Ac
| rowspan=2|29/2+#
| rowspan=2|
| rowspan=2|
|-
| IT (rare)
| 217Pa
|-
| 218Pa
|
| style="text-align:right" | 91
| style="text-align:right" | 127
| 218.020042(26)
| 0.113(1) ms
| α
| 214Ac
|
|
|
|-
| rowspan=2|219Pa
| rowspan=2|
| rowspan=2 style="text-align:right" | 91
| rowspan=2 style="text-align:right" | 128
| rowspan=2|219.01988(6)
| rowspan=2|53(10) ns
| α
| 215Ac
| rowspan=2|9/2−
| rowspan=2|
| rowspan=2|
|-
| β+ (5×10−9%)
| 219Th
|-
| 220Pa
|
| style="text-align:right" | 91
| style="text-align:right" | 129
| 220.02188(6)
| 780(160) ns
| α
| 216Ac
| 1−#
|
| 
|-
| style="text-indent:1em" | 220m1Pa
|
| colspan="3" style="text-indent:2em" | 34(26) keV
| 308(+250-99) ns
| α
| 216Ac
| 
|
|
|-
| style="text-indent:1em" | 220m2Pa
|
| colspan="3" style="text-indent:2em" | 297(65) keV
| 69(+330-30) ns
| α
| 216Ac
| 
|
|
|-
| 221Pa
|
| style="text-align:right" | 91
| style="text-align:right" | 130
| 221.02188(6)
| 4.9(8) μs
| α
| 217Ac
| 9/2−
|
|
|-
| 222Pa
|
| style="text-align:right" | 91
| style="text-align:right" | 131
| 222.02374(8)#
| 3.2(3) ms
| α
| 218Ac
|
|
|
|-
| rowspan=2|223Pa
| rowspan=2|
| rowspan=2 style="text-align:right" | 91
| rowspan=2 style="text-align:right" | 132
| rowspan=2|223.02396(8)
| rowspan=2|5.1(6) ms
| α
| 219Ac
| rowspan=2|
| rowspan=2|
| rowspan=2|
|-
| β+ (.001%)
| 223Th
|-
| rowspan=2|224Pa
| rowspan=2|
| rowspan=2 style="text-align:right" | 91
| rowspan=2 style="text-align:right" | 133
| rowspan=2|224.025626(17)
| rowspan=2|844(19) ms
| α (99.9%)
| 220Ac
| rowspan=2|5−#
| rowspan=2|
| rowspan=2|
|-
| β+ (.1%)
| 224Th
|-
| 225Pa
|
| style="text-align:right" | 91
| style="text-align:right" | 134
| 225.02613(8)
| 1.7(2) s
| α
| 221Ac
| 5/2−#
|
|
|-
| rowspan=2|226Pa
| rowspan=2|
| rowspan=2 style="text-align:right" | 91
| rowspan=2 style="text-align:right" | 135
| rowspan=2|226.027948(12)
| rowspan=2|1.8(2) min
| α (74%)
| 222Ac
| rowspan=2|
| rowspan=2|
| rowspan=2|
|-
| β+ (26%)
| 226Th
|-
| rowspan=2|227Pa
| rowspan=2|
| rowspan=2 style="text-align:right" | 91
| rowspan=2 style="text-align:right" | 136
| rowspan=2|227.028805(8)
| rowspan=2|38.3(3) min
| α (85%)
| 223Ac
| rowspan=2|(5/2−)
| rowspan=2|
| rowspan=2|
|-
| EC (15%)
| 227Th
|-
| rowspan=2|228Pa
| rowspan=2|
| rowspan=2 style="text-align:right" | 91
| rowspan=2 style="text-align:right" | 137
| rowspan=2|228.031051(5)
| rowspan=2|22(1) h
| β+ (98.15%)
| 228Th
| rowspan=2|3+
| rowspan=2|
| rowspan=2|
|-
| α (1.85%)
| 224Ac
|-
| rowspan=2|229Pa
| rowspan=2|
| rowspan=2 style="text-align:right" | 91
| rowspan=2 style="text-align:right" | 138
| rowspan=2|229.0320968(30)
| rowspan=2|1.50(5) d
| EC (99.52%)
| 229Th
| rowspan=2|(5/2+)
| rowspan=2|
| rowspan=2|
|-
| α (.48%)
| 225Ac
|-
| style="text-indent:1em" | 229mPa
|
| colspan="3" style="text-indent:2em" | 11.6(3) keV
| 420(30) ns
|
|
| 3/2−
|
|
|-
| rowspan=3|230Pa
| rowspan=3|
| rowspan=3 style="text-align:right" | 91
| rowspan=3 style="text-align:right" | 139
| rowspan=3|230.034541(4)
| rowspan=3|17.4(5) d
| β+ (91.6%)
| 230Th
| rowspan=3|(2−)
| rowspan=3|
| rowspan=3|
|-
| β− (8.4%)
| 230U
|-
| α (.00319%)
| 226Ac
|-
| rowspan=4|231Pa
| rowspan=4|Protoactinium
| rowspan=4 style="text-align:right" | 91
| rowspan=4 style="text-align:right" | 140
| rowspan=4|231.0358840(24)
| rowspan=4|3.276(11)×104 y
| α
| 227Ac
| rowspan=4|3/2−
| rowspan=4|1.0000
| rowspan=4|
|-
| CD (1.34×10−9%)
| 207Tl24Ne
|-
| SF (3×10−10%)
| (various)
|-
| CD (10−12%)
| 208Pb23F
|-
| rowspan=2|232Pa
| rowspan=2|
| rowspan=2 style="text-align:right" | 91
| rowspan=2 style="text-align:right" | 141
| rowspan=2|232.038592(8)
| rowspan=2|1.31(2) d
| β−
| 232U
| rowspan=2|(2−)
| rowspan=2|
| rowspan=2|
|-
| EC (.003%)
| 232Th
|-
| 233Pa
|
| style="text-align:right" | 91
| style="text-align:right" | 142
| 233.0402473(23)
| 26.975(13) d
| β−
| 233U
| 3/2−
| Trace
|
|-
| rowspan=2|234Pa
| rowspan=2|Uranium Z
| rowspan=2 style="text-align:right" | 91
| rowspan=2 style="text-align:right" | 143
| rowspan=2|234.043308(5)
| rowspan=2|6.70(5) h
| β−
| 234U
| rowspan=2|4+
| rowspan=2|Trace
| rowspan=2|
|-
| SF (3×10−10%)
| (various)
|-
| rowspan=3 style="text-indent:1em" | 234mPa
| rowspan=3|Uranium X2Brevium
| rowspan=3 colspan="3" style="text-indent:2em" | 78(3) keV
| rowspan=3|1.17(3) min
| β− (99.83%)
| 234U
| rowspan=3|(0−)
| rowspan=3|Trace
| rowspan=3|
|-
| IT (.16%)
| 234Pa
|-
| SF (10−10%)
| (various)
|-
| 235Pa
|
| style="text-align:right" | 91
| style="text-align:right" | 144
| 235.04544(5)
| 24.44(11) min
| β−
| 235U
| (3/2−)
|
|
|-
| rowspan=2|236Pa
| rowspan=2|
| rowspan=2 style="text-align:right" | 91
| rowspan=2 style="text-align:right" | 145
| rowspan=2|236.04868(21)
| rowspan=2|9.1(1) min
| β−
| 236U
| rowspan=2|1(−)
| rowspan=2|
| rowspan=2|
|-
| β−, SF (6×10−8%)
| (various)
|-
| 237Pa
|
| style="text-align:right" | 91
| style="text-align:right" | 146
| 237.05115(11)
| 8.7(2) min
| β−
| 237U
| (1/2+)
|
|
|-
| rowspan=2|238Pa
| rowspan=2|
| rowspan=2 style="text-align:right" | 91
| rowspan=2 style="text-align:right" | 147
| rowspan=2|238.05450(6)
| rowspan=2|2.27(9) min
| β−
| 238U
| rowspan=2|(3−)#
| rowspan=2|
| rowspan=2|
|-
| β−, SF (2.6×10−6%)
| (various)
|-
| 239Pa
|
| style="text-align:right" | 91
| style="text-align:right" | 148
| 239.05726(21)#
| 1.8(5) h
| β−
| 239U
| (3/2)(−#)
|
|

Actinides and fission products

Protactinium-230
Protactinium-230 has 139 neutrons and a half-life of 17.4 days. Most of the time (92%), it undergoes beta plus decay to 230Th, with a minor (8%) beta-minus decay branch leading to 230U. It also has a very rare (.003%) alpha decay mode leading to 226Ac. It is not found in nature because its half-life is short and it is not found in the decay chains of 235U, 238U, or 232Th. It has a mass of 230.034541 u.

Protactinium-230 is of interest as a progenitor of uranium-230, an isotope that has been considered for use in targeted alpha-particle therapy (TAT). It can be produced through proton or deuteron irradiation of nautral thorium.

Protactinium-231
Protactinium-231 is the longest-lived isotope of protactinium, with a half-life of 32,760 years. In nature, it is found in trace amounts as part of the actinium series, which starts with the primordial isotope uranium-235; the equilibrium concentration in uranium ore is 46.55 231Pa per million 235U. In nuclear reactors, it is one of the few long-lived radioactive actinides produced as a byproduct of the projected thorium fuel cycle, as a result of (n,2n) reactions where a fast neutron removes a neutron from 232Th or 232U, and can also be destroyed by neutron capture, though the cross section for this reaction is also low.

binding energy: 1759860 keV
beta decay energy: −382 keV

spin: 3/2−
mode of decay: alpha to 227Ac, also others

possible parent nuclides: beta from 231Th, EC from 231U, alpha from 235Np.

Protactinium-233

Protactinium-233 is also part of the thorium fuel cycle. It is an intermediate beta decay product between thorium-233 (produced from natural thorium-232 by neutron capture) and uranium-233 (the fissile fuel of the thorium cycle). Some thorium-cycle reactor designs try to protect Pa-233 from further neutron capture producing Pa-234 and U-234, which are not useful as fuel.

Protactinium-234
Protactinium-234 is a member of the uranium series with a half-life of 6.70 hours. It was discovered by Otto Hahn in 1921.

Protactinium-234m
Protactinium-234m is a member of the uranium series with a half-life of 1.17 minutes. It was discovered in 1913 by Kazimierz Fajans and Oswald Helmuth Göhring, who named it brevium for its short half-life. About 99.8% of decays of 234Th produce this isomer instead of the ground state (t1/2 = 6.70 hours).

References 

 Isotope masses from:

 Isotopic compositions and standard atomic masses from:

 Half-life, spin, and isomer data selected from the following sources.

 
Protactinium
Protactinium